Bahtiyor Nurullaev (born ) is an Uzbekistani male weightlifter, competing in the 85 kg category and representing Uzbekistan at international competitions. He competed at world championships, most recently at the 1999 World Weightlifting Championships. He also competed at the 1996 Summer Olympics and the 2000 Summer Olympics.

Major results

References

External links
Sports Reference

1975 births
Living people
Uzbekistani male weightlifters
Place of birth missing (living people)
Weightlifters at the 1998 Asian Games
Weightlifters at the 2002 Asian Games
Asian Games medalists in weightlifting
Asian Games bronze medalists for Uzbekistan
Medalists at the 1998 Asian Games
Medalists at the 2002 Asian Games
Olympic weightlifters of Uzbekistan
Weightlifters at the 1996 Summer Olympics
Weightlifters at the 2000 Summer Olympics
20th-century Uzbekistani people
21st-century Uzbekistani people